Time Warner Interactive (Group) (TWI) was a video game publishing division within Time Warner. It was formed in 1993 after Time Warner acquired a controlling interest in Atari Games, which was already partly held by Time Warner. It was active until 1996 when WMS Industries, the owners of the Williams, Bally and Midway arcade brands, bought the company.

This company was previously known as Tengen, the consumer division of Atari Games. Atari Games would continue to operate under its own name until March 29, 1996, when both it and Time Warner Interactive were bought by WMS Industries and was subsequently absorbed into Williams Entertainment (later renamed Midway Home Entertainment), while Atari Games became part of Midway, and eventually was renamed Midway Games West in 1999.

Time Warner Interactive, was responsible for games, such as Rise of the Robots, Primal Rage and T-MEK.

Time Warner also bought the UK publisher Renegade Software in 1995 and kept it independent as Warner Interactive Entertainment, before merging with the European arm of TWI in 1996. Both subsidiaries were short-lived; Time Warner Interactive was formed from the Atari Games acquisition in 1993 and sold to WMS Industries on March 29, 1996, while Time Warner Interactive Japan dissolved in the same year due to WMS not seeing the merit of having a Japanese division in Japan due to how very costly it is for Midway to have a Japanese video game studio in their hands in Lost Decade situation, and European division of Time Warner Interactive (including Renegade Software) existed only two years before being sold to GT Interactive in November 1996 (GT Interactive are best known for distribution of Doom II, Duke Nukem 3D, and Quake as shareware).

List of games

References

External links
Midway Games West Inc. on MobyGames (includes the history as Time Warner Interactive Inc.)
Time Warner Interactive Inc. on MobyGames
Warner Interactive Entertainment Ltd. on MobyGames

Video game publishers
Video game companies established in 1993
Video game companies disestablished in 1996
Defunct video game companies of the United States
Video game development companies